Loren Ferré is an American university sports administrator, currently serving as athletic director at Washburn University. Ferré has served at Washburn, an NCAA Division II sports program, since February 1996.

Early career
Ferré graduated from Texas Christian University in 1971 and completed his master's degree from North Texas State University in 1982. After graduating from North Texas State, Ferré began his athletic career at the North Texas State as an event coordinator, a post he held from 1978 to 1980. In 1980, he was promoted to associate athletic director, a position he served until 1990. In 1990, Ferré moved to Spearfish, South Dakota to become the athletic director for the Black Hills State Yellow Jackets. While at Black Hills State, Ferré also served as the Donald E. Young Sports Fitness Center director. Ferré was named athletic director at Washburn University in December 1995.

Washburn University
On December 20, 1995, Washburn University announced that Ferré as the next athletic director. During his time at Washburn, Ferré has increased the number of scholarships and departmental fundraising, making those two things his top priority. Since 1996, Ferré has led Washburn sports programs to 28 Mid-America Intercollegiate Athletics Association conference championships and 58 NCAA Division II appearances.

Ferré was named the 2005 Central Region Athletic Director of the Year.

Personal life 
Ferré is married to his wife, Sarah, and has two daughters.

References

External links 
 Washburn profile

Living people
University of North Texas alumni
Texas Christian University alumni
Black Hills State Yellow Jackets athletic directors
Washburn Ichabods athletic directors
Sportspeople from Kansas
Year of birth missing (living people)